Lorenza Avemanay was an indigenous Ecuadorian who led an 1803 revolt against the Spanish occupation in Guamote. She was later captured and executed by the Spanish authorities.

References

 The Northeastern Dictionary of Women's Biography: Revised by Maggy Hendry
 Sisterhood Is Global: The International Women's Movement Anthology

Year of birth missing
Year of death missing
Ecuadorian rebels
Indigenous military personnel of the Americas
Indigenous rebellions against the Spanish Empire
Women in 19th-century warfare
Women in war in South America
1803 in Ecuador
19th-century Ecuadorian people
19th-century Ecuadorian women